Kwan Kung Pavilion is a temple on Cheung Chau island in Hong Kong. It was built in 1973, and is dedicated to the Martial God of War and Wealth, Kwan Tai (also transliterated as Lord Guan or Kwan Kung). His Sabre, The Kwan Dou, is also displayed in the Kwan Kung Pavilion.

The temple contains an eight-feet-tall Kwan Tai statue crafted from a whole piece of camphor wood. There is an incense burner with two dragons in front of the pavilion.

See also
 Martial temple
 Hip Tin temples in Hong Kong
 Kwan Tai temples in Hong Kong
 Places of worship in Hong Kong

References

External links
 openlife entry
 Pictures of the temple:   

Taoist temples in Hong Kong
Cheung Chau